In biology, nastic movements are non-directional responses to stimuli (e.g. temperature, humidity, light irradiance), and are usually associated with plants. The movement can be due to changes in turgor (internal pressure within plant cells). Decrease in turgor pressure causes shrinkage, while increase in turgor pressure brings about swelling. Nastic movements differ from tropic movements in that the direction of tropic responses depends on the direction of the stimulus, whereas the direction of nastic movements is independent of the stimulus's position. The tropic movement is growth movement but nastic movement may or may not be growth movement. The rate or frequency of these responses increases as intensity of the stimulus increases. An example of such a response is the opening and closing of flowers (photonastic response), movement of euglena, chlamydomonas towards the source of light. They are named with the suffix "-nasty" and have prefixes that depend on the stimuli:
 Epinasty: downward-bending from growth at the top, for example, the bending down of a heavy flower.
 Hyponasty: upward bending of leaves from growth in the petiole (leaf stalk)
 Photonasty: response to light
 Nyctinasty: movements at night or in the dark
 Chemonasty: response to chemicals or nutrients
 Hydronasty: response to water
 Thermonasty: response to temperature
 Seismonasty: response to shock
 Geonasty/gravinasty: response to gravity
 Thigmonasty/seismonasty/haptonasty: response to contact

The suffix may come from Greek νάσσω = "I press", ναστός = "pressed", ἐπιναστια = "the condition of being pressed upon".

See also
For other types of movement, see:
 Taxis
 Tropism
 Kinesis

References

External links
'Daisy - 'Day's Eye or Eye of the Day'.

Physiology
Articles containing video clips

de:Pflanzenbewegung#Nastien und Tropismen